Willerby is a small village and civil parish in the Ryedale district of North Yorkshire, England. It is contiguous with neighbouring Staxton. The villages of Staxton, Willerby and Binnington make up the civil parish of Willerby. Until 1974 the village lay in the historic county boundaries of the East Riding of Yorkshire.

According to the 2001 UK census, Willerby parish had a population of 708, increasing to 737 at the 2011 Census.

References

External links

Villages in North Yorkshire
Civil parishes in North Yorkshire